Siegfried Stark (born 12 June 1955 in Rehna, Mecklenburg-Vorpommern) is a retired East German decathlete.

He won the bronze medals at the European Championships in 1978 and 1982. At the Olympic Games he finished sixth in 1976 and did not finish in 1980.

His personal best was 8534 points, achieved in May 1980 in Halle. This ranks him eighth among German decathletes, behind Jürgen Hingsen, Uwe Freimuth, Siegfried Wentz, Frank Busemann, Torsten Voss, Guido Kratschmer and Paul Meier.

References

1955 births
Living people
People from Nordwestmecklenburg
East German decathletes
Athletes (track and field) at the 1976 Summer Olympics
Athletes (track and field) at the 1980 Summer Olympics
Olympic athletes of East Germany
European Athletics Championships medalists